Aleksandar Ranković (Serbian Cyrillic: Александар Ранковић; born 31 August 1978) is a Serbian football manager and former player. He is the assistant manager of FC Utrecht of the Dutch Eredivisie. As a player, Ranković played the entirety of his professional career in the Netherlands and his native Serbia.

Club career
Ranković started his professional career with FK Rad, making his first appearances in 1997, at the age of 19. In 2002, Dutch side SBV Vitesse showed interest for the player and brought him into the Eredivisie, where he played as a first team regular for three seasons. In 2005, he moved to fellow Eredivisie participants ADO Den Haag where he became one of their key players.

Ranković hit the news in January 2007, when he was sent off in a 3–1 defeat to AZ, match in which he also scored a goal. The incident took place after the referee Kevin Blom awarded a penalty to AZ, and Ranković pushed Blom whilst shouting "When I see you in the city, I'll kill you". Ranković received a five match ban for the death threats. He later apologized for the incident.

On 22 June 2011, Ranković signed a one-year deal with FK Partizan.

Coaching career
On 15 May 2020, Ranković was announced as the new head coach of ADO Den Haag until 2022.

References

External links
 Voetbal International - Aleksandar Ranković
 Aleksandar Ranković Stats at Utakmica.rs

1978 births
Living people
Footballers from Belgrade
Serbian footballers
Serbian expatriate footballers
Association football midfielders
FK Rad players
FK Partizan players
Serbian SuperLiga players
SBV Vitesse players
ADO Den Haag players
Eerste Divisie players
Eredivisie players
Expatriate footballers in the Netherlands
Serbian expatriate sportspeople in the Netherlands
ADO Den Haag managers
Eredivisie managers
Serbian expatriate football managers
Serbian football managers